Klaudia Natalia Adamek (born 22 March 1999) is a Polish athlete. She competed at the 2021 World Athletics Relays, winning the silver medal in the women's 4 × 100 metres relay event.

References

External links
 

1999 births
Living people
Polish female sprinters
Place of birth missing (living people)
Athletes (track and field) at the 2020 Summer Olympics
Olympic athletes of Poland
21st-century Polish women